Era is the second studio album by the indie pop band Echo Lake. It was released in 2015 on No Pain in Pop.

Track listing

References

2015 albums
Echo Lake (band) albums